Guzmania devansayana is a plant species in the genus Guzmania. This species is native to Ecuador and Peru.

References

devansayana
Flora of Peru
Flora of Ecuador
Plants described in 1883